The Adam's apple or laryngeal prominence is the protrusion in the human neck formed by the angle of the thyroid cartilage surrounding the larynx, typically visible in men, less frequently in women. The prominence of the adam's apple increases as a secondary male sex characteristic in puberty.

Structure

The topographic structure which is externally visible and colloquially called the "Adam's apple" is caused by an anatomical structure of the thyroid cartilage called the laryngeal prominence or laryngeal protuberance protruding and forming a "bump" under the skin at the front of the throat. All human beings with a normal anatomy have a laryngeal protuberance of the thyroid cartilage. This prominence is typically larger and more externally noticeable in adult males. There are two reasons for this phenomenon. Firstly, the structural size of the thyroid cartilage in males tends to increase during puberty, and the laryngeal protuberance becomes more anteriorally-focused. Secondly, the larynx, which the thyroid cartilage partially envelops, increases in size in male subjects during adolescence, moving the thyroid cartilage and its laryngeal protuberance towards the front of the neck. The adolescent development of both the larynx and the thyroid cartilage in males occur as a result of hormonal changes, especially the normal increase in testosterone production in adolescent males. In females, the laryngeal protuberance sits on the upper edge of the thyroid cartilage, and the larynx tends to be smaller in size, and so the "bump" caused by protrusion of the laryngeal protuberance is much less visible or not discernible. Even so, many women display an externally visible protrusion of the thyroid cartilage, an "Adam's apple", to varying degrees which are usually minor, and this should not normally be viewed as a medical disorder.

Function
The Adam's apple, in relation with the thyroid cartilage which forms it, helps protect the walls and the frontal part of the larynx, including the vocal cords (which are located directly behind it).

Another function of the Adam's apple is related to the deepening of the voice. During adolescence, the thyroid cartilage grows together with the larynx. Consequently, the laryngeal prominence grows in size mainly in men. Together, a larger soundboard is made up in phonation apparatus and, as a result, men get a deeper voice note.

Society and culture

While both men and women can possess an Adam's apple, the larger frequency of its appearance in men has led to the perception of the Adam's apple as an indicator of masculinity. As such, transgender women may choose to undergo cosmetic surgery to remove it from their necks, a process known as chondrolaryngoplasty, or coloquially as a "tracheal shave". Transgender men may choose to augment and thereby enlarge the Adam's apple, a process known as masculinization.

Chondrolaryngoplasty surgery is effective and studies done by surgeons in Tel Aviv and Los Angeles have demonstrated complications to be few and, if present, transient.

Etymology

The English term "Adam's apple" is a calque of Latin , which is found in European medical texts from as early as 1600.  "Adam's Apple" is found in a 1662 English translation of Thomas Bartholin's 1651 work Anatomia.

The 1662 citation includes an explanation for the origin of the phrase: a piece of forbidden fruit was supposedly embedded in the throat of Adam, who according to the Abrahamic religions was the first man:   This etymology is also proposed by Brewer's Dictionary of Phrase and Fable and the 1913 edition of Webster's Dictionary. The story is not found in the Bible or other Judeo-Christian or Islamic writings.

Linguist Alexander Gode proposed in 1968 that the Latin phrase  (literally: 'Adam's apple') was a mistranslation of the Hebrew " meaning 'male bump.  The confusion was supposedly due in the fact that in Hebrew language the proper name "Adam" literally means "man", and the word for "apple", "tapuach", is similar to the word "" which means "swollen", thus in combination: the swelling of a man.

The medical term "prominentia laryngea" (laryngeal prominence) was introduced by the Basle Nomina Anatomica in 1895.

In the American South, goozle is used colloquially to describe the Adam's apple, likely derived from guzzle.

Additional images

See also

Hyoid bone

References

External links

 Lesson 11 at The Anatomy Lesson by Wesley Norman (Georgetown University)

Adam and Eve
Human head and neck
Secondary sexual characteristics